The Malawi national korfball team is managed by the Malawi Korfball Association (MKA), representing Malawi in korfball international competitions.

Tournament history

References

korfball
National korfball teams
Korfball in Malawi